Raul Ștefan Gavîrliță (born 18 August 1999) is a Romanian professional footballer who plays as a forward for AFC Odorheiu Secuiesc.

Honours
Astra Giurgiu
Cupa României: Runner-up 2018–19

References

External links
 
 Raul Gavîrliță at lpf.ro

1999 births
Living people
Sportspeople from Brașov
Romanian footballers
Association football forwards
FC Brașov (1936) players
Liga I players
Liga II players
Liga III players
FC Astra Giurgiu players
FC Metaloglobus București players